Ma Xingyu (born 4 November 1989 in Qingdao, Shandong) is a Chinese football player who currently plays for Chinese Super League side Henan Jianye.

Club career 
Ma Xingyu was a graduate of the Shandong Luneng under-19 youth team and was promoted to the senior team on December 26, 2007, in preparation for the 2008 league season. He would eventually go on to make his debut on September 6, 2009, when he came on as a substitute in a league game against Qingdao Jonoon in a 3–1 defeat.

Ma moved to third tier club Qingdao Hainiu as a loan player on July 22, 2013, for the remainder of the season to gain some playing time. His time at the club would see him gain promotion and win the division title, which lead to a permanent move.

On 27 February 2018, Ma transferred to Chinese Super League club Henan Jianye. He would make his debut for the club on March 2, 2018, in a league game against Tianjin Quanjian F.C. that ended in a 4–0 defeat.

Career statistics 
Statistics accurate as of match played 11 July 2022.

Honours

Club
Shandong Luneng
Chinese Super League: 2008

Qingdao Hainiu
China League Two: 2013

References

External links 
Player stats at Sohu.com
Player profile at Shandong Luneng website
 

1989 births
Living people
Chinese footballers
Footballers from Qingdao
Shandong Taishan F.C. players
Qingdao F.C. players
Henan Songshan Longmen F.C. players
Chinese Super League players
China League One players
China League Two players
Association football midfielders